September 12th is an independent film, written and directed by John Touhey.  Set on the third anniversary of the September 11 attacks, the film centers on the long-term effects the event had on many Americans.

The movie was filmed in several locations in the New York City boroughs of Manhattan, Brooklyn and Staten Island, as well as East Meadow, New York, Brooklyn, New York and Cranford, New Jersey.

Awards
Best Feature - Long Island Film Festival
Best Feature - Longbaugh Film Festival

Cast
Joe Iacovino - Frank
James Garrett - Rick
Ernest Mingione - Eddie
Kim Strouse - Monique

External links

Official site

2000s English-language films
Aftermath of the September 11 attacks
American independent films
Films set in 2004